Almonte may refer to:

People
 Almonte (surname)

Places
 Almonte, Spain, a town and municipality in Huelva province, Spain
 Almonte, Ontario, a town in Ontario, Canada
 Almonte, California, an unincorporated community in Marin County

Rivers
 Almonte (river), a river in Spain

See also
 Almont (disambiguation)